is a railway station on the AbukumaExpress in the city of Date, Fukushima Japan.

Lines

Station layout
Takako Station has two elevated opposed side platforms There is no station building, and the station is unattended.

Adjacent stations

History
Takako Station opened on July 1, 1988.

Passenger statistics
In fiscal 2015, the station was used by an average of 63 passengers daily (boarding passengers only).

Surrounding area
Takako "Hightown"
Fukushima Prefectural Route 4 (Fukushima Hobara Line)
Takako Lake - one of the Takako Ni-juu Kyou (Takako twenty scenic views)
Kameoka Hachimangū (founded here, now located in Sendai)
Takakogaoka Hall Remains
Awashima Shrine
Takako Community Center
Kumasaka Family Tomb

See also
 List of Railway Stations in Japan

External links

  Abukuma Express home page

References

Railway stations in Fukushima Prefecture
Abukuma Express Line
Railway stations in Japan opened in 1988
Date, Fukushima